L'empire de la honte,  (The Empire of Shame) is a book by Swiss sociologist and former United Nations special correspondent for the right to food (until 2008) Jean Ziegler in which he elaborates on the concept of structural violence due to organized scarcity of food, caused by neoliberalist capitalism.

External links
 
 
 

French books
Criticism of capitalism